Myra is an unincorporated community in western Cooke County, Texas, United States.  It lies just off U.S. Route 82 west of the city of Gainesville, the county seat of Cooke County.  Its elevation is 935 feet (285 m).  it had a post office, with the ZIP code 76253 until early 2013. It is now closed.

References

Unincorporated communities in Cooke County, Texas
Unincorporated communities in Texas